The men's 3000 metres event  at the 1996 European Athletics Indoor Championships was held in Stockholm Globe Arena on 8–9 March.

Results

References

3000 metres at the European Athletics Indoor Championships
3000